Rudisociaria is a genus of moths belonging to the family Tortricidae.

Species
Rudisociaria expeditana (Snellen, 1883)
Rudisociaria velutinum (Walsingham, 1900)

See also
List of Tortricidae genera

References

External links
Tortricid.net

Tortricidae genera
Olethreutinae